The 1910–11 MIT Engineers men's ice hockey season was the 12th season of play for the program.

Season
The Boston Arena served as the home arena for MIT this season. 

The team did not have a head coach but Henry Stucklen served as team manager.

Note: Massachusetts Institute of Technology athletics were referred to as 'Engineers' or 'Techmen' during the first two decades of the 20th century. By 1920 all sports programs had adopted the Engineer moniker.

Roster

Standings

Schedule and Results

|-
!colspan=12 style=";" | Regular Season

References

MIT Engineers men's ice hockey seasons
MIT
MIT
MIT
MIT
MIT